NLA University College is a private Norwegian Christian college accredited by the Norwegian Agency for Quality Assurance in Education. The school has about 2,000 students and 200 employees distributed across three institutions: Bergen NLA College, Gimlekollen NLA College in Kristiansand, and Staffeldtsgate NLA College in Oslo. The institution in Bergen is the largest and hosts the college's head office. NLA University College acquired its institutions in Oslo and Kristiansand after the colleges there merged with NLA University College on January 1, 2013.

NLA University College is the only private college in Norway offering primary school teacher education. This program is offered in Bergen, where preschool teacher education is also offered together with bachelor's and master's degrees in education, intercultural understanding, and theology / practical theology and management. In Oslo, bachelor's degrees in economics are offered through the Hauge School of Management, as well as bachelor's degrees in music performance and practical theology. The Gimlekollen NLA College site offers a bachelor's and master's degree in journalism, as well as bachelor's degrees and one-year programs in intercultural communication, communication and life orientation, and information and communication work.

History
The school started offering instruction in Bergen in the fall of 1968 under the name Norsk Lærerakademi, "Norwegian Teachers' Academy". The college has the right to hold examinations in a number of subjects within Christianity, education, and media studies.

Management and ownership
The college is run by a board elected by its general meeting. NLA University College is owned by the following Christian organizations:
 Normisjon
 The Norwegian Missionary Society
 The Inner Mission Association
 The Norwegian Christian Student and School Association
 The Norwegian Lutheran Mission
 Norwegian Sunday Schools
 The Evangelical Lutheran Free Church of Norway

References

External links
 NLA University College homepage

Education in Bergen
Educational institutions established in 1968
1968 establishments in Norway
Christian schools in Norway
Global Confessional and Missional Lutheran Forum members